The 2019 UAB Blazers football team represented the University of Alabama at Birmingham in the 2019 NCAA Division I FBS football season. The Blazers played their home games at Legion Field in Birmingham, Alabama, and competed in the West Division of Conference USA (C-USA). They were led by fourth-year head coach Bill Clark.

Preseason

CUSA media poll
Conference USA released their preseason media poll on July 16, 2019, with the Blazers predicted to finish in fourth place in the West Division.

Preseason All-Conference USA teams
2019 Preseason All-Conference USA

Schedule
UAB announced its 2019 football schedule on January 10, 2019. The 2019 schedule consists of 6 home and 6 away games in the regular season.

Game summaries

Alabama State

at Akron

South Alabama

at Western Kentucky

Rice

at UTSA

Old Dominion

at Tennessee

at Southern Miss

UTEP

Louisiana Tech

at North Texas

at Florida Atlantic (C-USA Championship Game)

vs. Appalachian State (New Orleans Bowl)

References

UAB
UAB Blazers football seasons
UAB Blazers football